Navaandorjiin Jadambaa (Mongolian: Наваандоржийн Жадамбаа; 1900–1939) was the first republican Head of State of Mongolia. He became Acting Chairman of the State Great Hural in November 1924 following the death of the Bogd Khan, as he was replaced by Peljidiin Genden only a day later.

Usually a regency would follow the death of the Bogd Khan until his reincarnation had reached his majority; however, in this case the search for the reincarnation of the Bogd Khan was banned and the country has maintained a republican constitution ever since.

1900 births
1939 deaths
Speakers of the State Great Khural
Heads of state of Mongolia
Communism in Mongolia